is a former Japanese cyclist. He competed in the team pursuit at the 1960 Summer Olympics.

References

External links
 

1940 births
Living people
Japanese male cyclists
Olympic cyclists of Japan
Cyclists at the 1960 Summer Olympics
Sportspeople from Aichi Prefecture
Asian Games medalists in cycling
Cyclists at the 1958 Asian Games
Asian Games gold medalists for Japan
Medalists at the 1958 Asian Games